Philomel Creek flows into the Black River near Watertown, New York, United States.

References 

Rivers of Jefferson County, New York
Rivers and Creeks in Watertown, New York